Kuvshinov is a rural locality (a khutor) in Atamanovskoye Rural Settlement, Danilovsky District, Volgograd Oblast, Russia. The population was 131 as of 2010. There are 3 streets.

Geography 
Kuvshinov is located in steppe, on the Beryozovka River, 55 km southeast of Danilovka (the district's administrative centre) by road. Rogachi is the nearest rural locality.

References 

Rural localities in Danilovsky District, Volgograd Oblast